Carmen Elena Malo Merchán (born May 24, 1972 in Cuenca) is an Ecuadorian pistol shooter, who competed at three Olympic games. Malo made her official Olympic debut at the 2000 Summer Olympics in Sydney, where she finished twenty-first in the women's 10 m air pistol, with a score of 378 points, tying her position with Albania's Djana Mata, and Germany's Anke Völker, wife of multiple-time Olympic medalist Ralf Schumann.

At the 2004 Summer Olympics, Malo competed in two pistol shooting events. She placed fortieth in the women's 10 m air pistol, with a score of 365 points, but managed to obtain her second attempt for a medal in the women's 25 m pistol. Unfortunately, she scored only 536 points in the qualifying rounds, finishing in thirty-sixth place.

At the 2008 Summer Olympics in Beijing, Malo obtained a well-improved score of 559 points (281 for the precision shooting, and 278 for the rapid-fire stage) in the women's 25 m pistol event; however, her performance was insufficiently enough to qualify into the final, as she came only in penultimate place out of forty-one shooters, by just one point ahead of Canada's Avianna Chao.

References

External links
NBC 2008 Olympics profile

Ecuadorian female sport shooters
Living people
Olympic shooters of Ecuador
Shooters at the 2000 Summer Olympics
Shooters at the 2004 Summer Olympics
Shooters at the 2008 Summer Olympics
People from Cuenca, Ecuador
1972 births
South American Games bronze medalists for Ecuador
South American Games medalists in shooting
Competitors at the 2006 South American Games
21st-century Ecuadorian women